Taieb or Taïeb may refer to:

Jacqueline Taïeb (born 1948), French singer and songwriter
Maurice Taieb, (born 1935), Tunisian born French geologist and paleoanthropologist
Taïeb Boulahrouf (born 1923), Algerian politician and militant nationalist during the Algerian Liberation War
Walter Taieb (born 1973), French composer and conductor

See also
Stade Taïeb Mhiri, multi-purpose stadium in Sfax, Tunisia

Arabic-language surnames